The 6th Television State Awards festival (Sinhala: 6 වැනි රූපවාහිනී රාජ්‍ය සම්මාන උලෙළ), was held to honor the television programs of 2008 Sinhala television on September 14, 2009, at the Maharagama Youth Theater, Sri Lanka. The event was organized by the State Television Advisory Council, Arts Council of Sri Lanka, Department of Cultural Affairs, Ministry of Housing and Cultural Affairs. Prime Minister D. M. Jayaratne was attended as the Chief Guest.

The awards were presented to the best programs in various programs aired on 13 state and private television channels. At the award ceremony, prominent screenwriter Somaweera Senanayake received the Lifetime Achievement Award. Meanwhile, Thilak Jayaratne received the award for the best literary work written on television.

Awards

Media Section

Television Serial Section

References

Sri Lankan Television State Awards
Sri Lankan Television State Awards